Qeshm (also Romanized as Qishm; also known as Bandar-e Qeshm) is a coastal city and capital of Qeshm County, Hormozgan Province, Iran. At the 2016 census, its population was 40,678.

Gallery

References 

Populated places in Qeshm County
Cities in Hormozgan Province
Populated coastal places in Iran
Port cities and towns of the Persian Gulf
Port cities and towns in Iran